Standards with a Slight Touch of Jazz, also known by its subtitle Singing Songs Everybody Knows, is an album by American jazz vocalist Lorez Alexandria released by the King label in 1960.

Critical reception

AllMusic reviewer Hank Davis called the album "very collectible".

Track listing
 "Just One of Those Things" (Cole Porter) – 4:19
 "Then I'll Be Tired of You" (Arthur Schwartz, Yip Harburg) – 2:48
 "Lush Life" (Billy Strayhorn) – 2:06
 "Sometimes I'm Happy" (Vincent Youmans, Irving Caesar) – 2:29
 "Long Ago (and Far Away)" (George Gershwin, Jerone Kern) – 2:59
 "But Beautiful" (Jimmy Van Heusen, Johnny Burke) – 2:15
 "I'm Beginning to See the Light" (Duke Ellington, Don George, Johnny Hodges, Harry James) – 4:20
 "I Can't Believe That You're in Love with Me" (Jimmy McHugh, Clarence Gaskill) – 3:05
 "Spring Is Here" (Richard Rodgers, Lorenz Hart) – 3:35
 "Angel Eyes" (Matt Dennis, Earl Brent) – 4:20
 "Better Luck Next Time" (Irving Berlin) – 3:05
 "I Didn't Know What Time It Was" (Rodgers, Hart) – 3:36

Personnel
Lorez Alexandria – vocals
Unidentified musicians

References 

King Records (United States) albums
Lorez Alexandria albums
1960 albums